In geodesy and astrometry, earth orientation parameters (EOP) describe irregularities in the rotation of planet Earth.
EOP provide the rotational transform from the International Terrestrial Reference System (ITRS) to the International Celestial Reference System (ICRS), or vice versa, as a function of time.

Earth's rotational velocity is not constant over time. Any motion of mass in or on Earth causes a slowdown or speedup of the rotation speed, or a change of rotation axis. Small motions produce changes too small to be measured, but movements of very large mass, like sea currents, tides, or those resulting from earthquakes, can produce discernible changes in the rotation and can change very precise astronomical observations. Global simulations of atmosphere, ocean, and land dynamics are used to create effective angular momentum (EAM) functions that can be used to predict changes in EOP.

Components

Universal time
Universal time (UT1) tracks the Earth's rotation in time, which performs one revolution in about 24 hours. The Earth's rotation is uneven, so UT is not linear with respect to atomic time. It is practically proportional to the sidereal time, which is also a direct measure of Earth rotation. The excess revolution time is called length of day (LOD). The absolute value of UT1 can be determined using space geodetic observations, such as Very Long Baseline Interferometry and Lunar laser ranging, whereas LOD can be derived from satellite observations, such as GPS, GLONASS, Galileo and Satellite laser ranging to geodetic satellites. LOD is changing due to gravitational effects from external bodies and geophysical processes occurring in different Earth layers. Then, the LOD prediction is extremely difficult due to extreme events such as El Niño which demonstrated themselves in the LOD signals.

Coordinates of the pole
Due to the very slow pole motion of the Earth, the Celestial Ephemeris Pole (CEP, or celestial pole) does not stay still on the surface of the Earth. The Celestial Ephemeris Pole is calculated from observation data, and is  averaged, so it differs from the instantaneous rotation axis by quasi-diurnal terms, which are as small as under 0.01" (see ).  In setting up a coordinate system, a static terrestrial point called the IERS Reference Pole, or IRP, is used as the origin; the x-axis is in the direction of IRM, the IERS Reference Meridian; the y-axis is in the direction 90 degrees West longitude. x and y are the coordinates of the CEP relative to the IRP. Pole coordinates can be determined using various space geodesy and satellite geodesy techniques, e.g., Satellite laser ranging, Very Long Baseline Interferometry, however, the most accurate techniques are GPS, GLONASS, and Galileo.

Celestial pole offsets
Celestial pole offsets are described in the IAU Precession and Nutation models. The observed differences with respect to the conventional celestial pole position defined by the models are monitored and reported by the IERS.
Celestial pole offsets can only be obtained by the VLBI. The observed CPO can quantify the deficiencies of the IAU2006/2000A precession–nutation model, including the astronomically forced nutations and a component of nutation that is considered unpredictable. Some studies indicate that substantial FCN amplitude and phase disturbances occurred at the epochs close to the revealed GMJ events.

References

External links
 http://hpiers.obspm.fr/eop-pc/
 http://www.usno.navy.mil/USNO/earth-orientation
 https://web.archive.org/web/20130802032453/http://maia.usno.navy.mil/
 http://www.iers.org/

Dynamics of the Solar System
Rotation
Astrometry
Geodesy